Eugène Nyon (16 March 1812 – 29 January 1870 ) was a French vaudevillist and writer, particularly known for his historical novels and educational stories for young people.

His most famous story is Le Colon de Mettray, set in the Mettray Penal Colony. Eugène Nyon also collaborated with several magazines, including Revue pour tous, under the name Amédée Achard, and the Journal des dames et des modes, which he contributed Parisian chronicles under the name "Countess of Sabran" and of which he was the director for a time. In the theater, his most famous collaborator was Eugène Labiche.

He is buried at Montmartre Cemetery (26th division).

Works 

1842: Les Pérégrinations, escapades et aventures de Claude La Ramée et de son cousin Labiche, 1842 Texte en ligne
1843: Les Dots, nouvelles
1844: Les Dévouements
1844: Gloire et noblesse
1845: Le Colon de Mettray Texte en ligne
1845: Les Cieutat, ou le Siège de Villeneuve d'Agen sous Henri III
1846: Âme et grandeur
1846: Le Français en Écosse, ou le Page de Jacques V, histoire du XVIe
1861: Les Nobles Filles
1861: Contes et nouvelles. Gloire et noblesse. Les Dots
1862: Les Cœurs d'or
1863: Grandeur et décadence d'une capote rose
1863: La Reine de Jérusalem
1863: Les Enfants de Mérovée, récits historiques du Ve au VIIe, Texte en ligne
1863: Le Fils du gouverneur, ou le Siège de Villeneuve d'Agen sous Henri III
1864: Splendeur et misères d'un dictionnaire grec, souvenirs de pension
1864: Moumoute et Carnage
1865:Les Aventures de Joachim et de son ami Diego
1867: Paul et Jean
Theatre
Monsieur Jouvenot, ou les Cartes de visite, comédie en vaudevilles in 1 act, Paris, Théâtre de la Gaîté, 31 December 1837
Le Premier succès de Jean-Baptiste, comédie en vaudevilles in 2 acts, Paris, Théâtre des Délassements-Comiques, 2 November 1841
Les Noces de Jocrisse, folie-vaudeville in 2 acts, with Édouard Brisebarre, Paris, Théâtre des Folies-Dramatiques, 22 February 1842
L'Écuyer tranchant, comedy in 1 act, mixed with song, with Édouard Brisebarre, Paris, Théâtre de l'Ambigu-Comique, 22 May 1842
Les Deux Joseph, comédie en vaudevilles in 1 act, with Charles Potier, Paris, Théâtre des Folies-Dramatiques, 26 May 1842
Deux paires de bretelles, comédie en vaudevilles in 2 acts, with Édouard Brisebarre, Paris, Théâtre des Folies-Dramatiques, 3 February 1844
Le Zéro, comedy in 1 act, mixed with song, with Édouard Brisebarre, Paris, Théâtre de l'Ambigu-Comique, 10 March 1844
La Révolte des Marmouzets, comédie en vaudevilles in 1 act, with Édouard Brisebarre, Paris, Théâtre de l'Ambigu-Comique, 1 July 1845
Les Murs ont des oreilles, comédie en vaudevilles in 2 acts, mixed with songs, with Auguste Anicet-Bourgeois and Édouard Brisebarre, Paris, Théâtre du Gymnase-Dramatique, 10 September 1845
L'Enfant de la maison, vaudeville in 1 act, with Eugène Labiche and Charles Varin, Paris, Théâtre du Gymnase, 21 November 1845
La Modiste au camp, folie-vaudeville in 1 act, with Édouard Brisebarre, Paris, Théâtre des Folies-Dramatiques, 2 April 1846
La Baronne de Blignac, comédie en vaudevilles in 1 act, with Dumanoir, Paris, Théâtre des Variétés, 6 June 1846
L'Inventeur de la poudre, comédie en vaudevilles in 1 act, with Eugène Labiche and Auguste Lefranc, Paris, Théâtre du Palais-Royal, 17 June 1846
Roch et Luc, vaudeville in 1 act, with Édouard Brisebarre, Paris, Théâtre des Variétés, 16 November 1846
Les Trois paysans, vaudeville in 1 act, with Édouard Brisebarre, Paris, Théâtre des Variétés, 9 May 1847
Secours contre l'incendie, comedy mixed with distincts, in 1 act, with Auguste Lefranc, Paris, Théâtre du Palais-Royal, 6 July 1847
La Rose de Provins, vaudeville in 1 act, Paris, Théâtre des Folies-Dramatiques, 12 February 1848
Un Turc pris dans une porte, scènes de la vie nocturne, with Édouard Brisebarre, Paris, Théâtre des Folies-Dramatiques, 17 February 1849
Adrienne de Carotteville, ou la Reine de la fantaisie, parody in 1 act of the Juif Errant, with Édouard Brisebarre and Charles Potier, Paris, Théâtre des Délassements-Comiques, 2 July 1849
Rue de l'Homme-Armé, numéro 8 bis, comédie en vaudevilles in 4 acts, with Eugène Labiche, Paris, Théâtre des Variétés, 24 September 1849
Les Vignes du Seigneur, vaudeville in 1 act, with Édouard Brisebarre, Paris, Théâtre Montansier, 18 January 1850
Le Baiser de l'étrier, scènes de la vie de garçon, with Édouard Brisebarre, Paris, Théâtre du Vaudeville, 19 April 1850
En manches de chemise, vaudeville in 1 act, with Eugène Labiche and Auguste Lefranc, Paris, Théâtre du Palais-Royal, 8 August 1851
Histoire d'une rose et d'un croque-mort, drama in 5 acts, with Édouard Brisebarre, Paris, Théâtre de l'Ambigu-Comique, 16 August 1851
Drinn-Drinn, vaudeville in 1 act, with Édouard Brisebarre and Charles Labie, Paris, Théâtre des Variétés, 13 September 1851
Le Pour et le contre, comedy in 1 act and in prose, with Jean Lafitte, Paris, Théâtre-Français, 22 January 1852
Le Laquais d'un nègre, comédie en vaudevilles in 4 acts, with Édouard Brisebarre, Théâtre des Folies-Dramatiques, 27 January 1852
Histoire d'une femme mariée, drama in 3 acts, mixed with songs, with Édouard Brisebarre, Paris, Théâtre de l'Ambigu-Comique, 19 October 1852
Monsieur le Vicomte, comédie en vaudevilles in 2 acts, with Jules de Prémaray, Paris, Théâtre des Variétés, 10 January 1853
Monsieur de La Palisse, vaudeville in 1 act, with Pierre Carmouche and Davrecour, Paris, Théâtre des Variétés, 11 May 1854
Théodore, désespoirs nocturnes d'un célibataire, vaudeville in 1 act, with Édouard Brisebarre, 1854 Text on line
L'Hiver d'un homme marié, scènes de la vie conjugale, in 1 act, with Édouard Brisebarre, Paris, Théâtre du Vaudeville, 2 June 1855
Les Gens de théâtre, scènes de la vie dramatique in 5 parts, with Édouard Brisebarre, Paris, Théâtre de l'Odéon, 29 January 1857
Le Coq de Micylle, comedy in 2 acts, in verses, with Henry Trianon, Paris, Théâtre-Français, 7 May 1868.

References 

1812 births
1870 deaths
People from Savigliano
19th-century French dramatists and playwrights
Burials at Montmartre Cemetery